Polokwane (meaning "Sanctuary" in Northern Sotho), also known as Pietersburg, is a city and the capital of the Limpopo Province of South Africa. It is South Africa's largest urban centre north of Gauteng. It was one of the host cities of the 2010 FIFA World Cup.

History
In the 1840s, Voortrekkers under the leadership of Andries Potgieter established Zoutpansbergdorp, a town  to the northwest. This settlement had to be abandoned because of clashes with the local tribes.( Langa & Ledwaba clans) They founded a new town in 1886 and named it "Pietersburg" in honour of Voortrekker leader Petrus Jacobus Joubert. The British built a concentration camp at Pietersburg during the Boer War to incarcerate almost 4,000 Boer women and children. The town officially became a city on 23 April 1992; on 25 February 2005, the government declared the official name of the city as Polokwane, a name that was generally in use by the speakers of Northern Sotho. The city was host to 52nd national conference of the African National Congress, held in December 2007 and saw Jacob Zuma voted as President of the ANC.

Demographics
The population in 2022 is about 130,000 . Roughly 45.9% of people in the city are Sepedi speakers.  A large portion of the population are Afrikaners, and roughly 10,000 residents (roughly 8%) are English-speaking whites, primarily South Africans of British descent and White Zimbabweans, the latter of whom primarily moved to the area since 2000. Roughly 6.7% of people are Venda people.

Districts/suburbs/townships

Popular suburbs in the city include Westenburg, Nirvana, Bendor, Welgelegen, Moregloed, Annadale, Ivydale, Flora Park, Fauna Park, Penina Park, Ivy Park, Hospital Park, Ster Park, Dalmada, Broadlands, Woodlands, Southern Gateway and Thornhill. 

Besides the above-mentioned suburbs in the city, three clusters of suburbs around the city exist:

 The Seshego cluster - on the north-west outskirts of the city
 Molepo/Maja/Chuene cluster - 20 km south of the city centre
 Mankweng/Sebayeng/Dikgale cluster - 30 km east of the city centre

Climate

The city features a semiarid climate under the Köppen climate classification. Despite its position on the Tropic of Capricorn, the climate is tempered by its position on a plateau 1230 m above sea level. As with much of inland South Africa, Polokwane has experienced notably warmer seasons over the last decade than its long-term average.
The city has a dry climate with a summer rainy season and a pronounced dry spell during winter.

Transport

Air
The city is served by two airports. A public airport, Polokwane International Airport, is just north of the city, while the smaller Pietersburg Civil Aerodrome  is south-east of the city.

Roads

The city lies roughly halfway between Gauteng and the Zimbabwean border on the N1 highway, which connects Zimbabwe with the major cities of South Africa, such as Pretoria, Johannesburg, Bloemfontein, and Cape Town.

The R37 provincial route connects the city with Nelspruit. Running east, the R71 connects the city with Tzaneen, Phalaborwa, Bushbuckridge, and the Kruger National Park. To north-east, is the R81 connecting the city with Giyani and Malamulele. The R521 connects the city with Alldays and the R567 via Seshego connects Polokwane with the N11. The R71 is also well known to bikers who ride through the city annually, making it the biggest bike meeting in Africa. 

The Nelson Mandela road traffic island is situated on the outskirts of Polokwane when approaching from the direction of Johannesburg. It was built prior to the 2010 FIFA World Cup as part of beautifying the city for the event.

A number of private bus services run in the city and also services connect Polokwane to other major centres in the country.

Railways
The city is connected to Johannesburg and other major centres by rail. Agricultural produce in the area, including tomatoes, citrus fruit, sugar cane, peanuts, tea, bananas, and avocados, is also transported by freight rail.

Society and culture

Media
The South African Broadcasting Corporation has a branch in the city. The city also hosts a branch of the country's largest independent radio station, Jacaranda RM/FM, which is broadcast from either Pretoria, Nelspruit or Pietersburg/Polokwane. 

The first commercial radio station in Limpopo, CapricornFM, broadcasts from the city. Two additional radio stations are also situated in Polokwane. These include Energy FM and Munghana Lonene FM.  

The city has a selection of locally distributed newspapers. Two notable newspapers include The Review  and The Polokwane Observer.

Gambling
The Sun International casino and hotel is in the city. Meropa Casino and Entertainment World is a Moroccan-style, 24-hour casino with various outdoor entertainment amenities such as go-karts, minigolf, and a wildlife park.

Museums, monuments and memorials
 The Bakone Malapa Northern Sotho Open-Air Museum — Depicts the traditional and modern-day lifestyle of the Bakone people. The museum is centred on a traditional village still occupied by members of the tribe, who sell various crafts to tourists. Background information can be obtained in the visitor centre. Within the museum complex are archaeological sites with remains of iron- and copper-smelting installations, as well as rock paintings from around 1000 B.C.
 Eersteling Monuments — The site of the country's first gold crushing site and its first gold power plant are marked by monuments.
 The Irish House — Historic building which functions as a museum.

Places of worship

The largest Christian gathering in South Africa happens twice a year at Zion City, Moria near Pietersburg/Polokwane at Easter and again for the September end of year festival. The Zion Christian Church’s headquarters are at Zion City Moria, which is about 25 kilometres east of Pietersburg/Polokwane. Moria is the seat of the Zion Christian church - an entirely black denomination with about 16 million members formed in 1910 by Engenas Lekganyane - an indigenous church to Africa that is one of the only churches not established by evangelists from abroad.

The Star of David is the symbol of the ZCC and the two congregations that make up the church are today led by the grandsons of its founder - Barnabas Lekganyane and Saint Engenas Lekganyane. The ZCC is characterised by the emphasis it places on faith healing, purification rites, dancing, night communion, river baptism, the holy spirit, taboos and prophesying.

The ZCC has members in every country in Africa, and in most countries of the Middle East.

Synagogues
The first Jewish settlers in Pietersburg arrived between 1890 and 1900 from Lithuania, Russia, and Latvia, and the Pietersburg Hebrew Congregation was founded in 1897. A synagogue was built on Jorissen Street in 1921. The Jewish community grew rapidly in the 1930s and 1940s; a larger synagogue was built in 1953 and the old synagogue was then converted into a communal hall. The number of Jews in Pietersburg began to decline from the late 1950s. In 2003, as the congregation had dwindled, the synagogue was closed and its benches, bimah, and other contents were shipped to Israel, where they were installed in the Mevasser Synagogue in Tel Mond in memory of the Pietersburg synagogue.

Sports

Golf
The Pietersburg Golf Club along with the golf course was established in the late 1800s. The immaculate lush green course comprises a full 18 holes. Retief Goosen (born 3 February 1969) was born in Pietersburg and honed his skills at the Pietersburg Golf Club.

Cricket
The Polokwane Cricket Club is one of the oldest in the country and was established in 1902.

Netball
The Limpopo Baobabs represents the city as well as the province of Limpopo in the Brutal Fruit Netball Cup. South African Spar Protea goal shooter Lenize Potgieter was also born in Polokwane.

Rugby
Noordelikes Rugby Club is the largest and the best amateur rugby club based in the city. 

Starting in 2013, the city will host a Limpopo provincial team in the Vodacom Cup.

Springbok rugby captain, Victor Matfield grew up in Pietersburg.
Former Springbok rugby captain John Smit was born in Pietersburg.

Football
Polokwane City F.C., and Baroka F.C., South African football clubs, are based in the city.

Swimming
The city has a number of swimming clubs. Former Olympic gold-medalist and world-record swimmer Lyndon Ferns is from the city.

Tennis
A large tennis club is situated in the city, and various local tournaments are held regularly.

Baseball
In 2017, Gift Ngoepe, born in Pietersburg, became the first African player in the Major League Baseball, playing shortstop and second base for the Pittsburgh Pirates. Ngoepe's mother Maureen managed the baseball clubhouse in Randburg, near Johannesburg. Ngoepe's brother Victor also plays in the Pirates' farm system

Stadiums
 Peter Mokaba Stadium, a newly constructed stadium for the 2010 FIFA World Cup
 Pietersburg Stadium

Tourism

The city provides access to various nature and wildlife viewing opportunities for ecotourists. The Polokwane Bird and Reptile Park is home to over 280 species of birds. The Polokwane Game Reserve houses various South African species of wildlife, birdlife, and plants in an unspoiled bushveld environment. The Moletzie Bird Sanctuary protects rare birds like the Cape vulture. The Modjadji Rainforest near Duiwelskloof holds the largest concentration of indigenous cycads in the world, and Cheune Crocodile Farm provides a place to learn about the life of crocodiles.

An extensive art collection is preserved in the city's art gallery, open to the public. The city has more public sculptures per capita in its parks than elsewhere in South Africa. It was also the first city to unveil a bust of the ex-president Nelson Mandela in its City Square (Civic Gardens), and it was authorised by Nelson Mandela personally.

The city is considered the premier hunting destination in South Africa.

Commerce
The city hosts several major industries such as Coca-Cola, Freshmark (a division of Shoprite Checkers), and South African Breweries. As the capital of the Limpopo province, the city also has a large commercial area with the four largest banks in the country all having at least three branches in the city.
The city was well known for its manufacturing facility in Seshego of Tempest radios and hi-fis, the largest employer in the region.

Education

Tertiary education
The Tshwane University of Technology, Capricorn TVET College, and the University of South Africa have satellite campuses in the city. The University of Limpopo's Turfloop campus is situated about 30 km east of Polokwane.

Shopping malls
 Limpopo Mall
 Savannah Mall
 Cycad Center 
 Platinum Park
 Thornhill Shopping Center
 Mall of the North

See also

Sister cities
Pietersburg/Polokwane is a sister city with:

  Reggio Emilia, Italy
  Bulawayo, Zimbabwe

Sub-areas
 Polokwane Ext 44
 Westenburg

Notable people
 Mvzzle, DJ and record producer known for producing "Umlilo" by DJ Zinhle 
 Lyndon Ferns, Olympic gold-medalist and former world record swimmer
 Tlou Segolela, professional football player 
 Retief Goosen, professional golfer who was in the top ten in the Official World Golf Ranking for over 250 weeks between 2001 and 2007
 Lucas Malan, Afrikaans academic and poet
 Julius Malema, leader of the Economic Freedom Fighters and former ANC Youth League president
 Isaac Lesiba Maphotho, anti-apartheid activist, African National Congress (ANC) member and Umkhonto we Sizwe (MK) veteran
 Victor Matfield, former South African national rugby team captain
 Peter Mokaba, controversial anti-apartheid activist
 Gift Ngoepe, professional baseball player
 Caster Semenya, middle-distance runner and world champion
 John Smit, former South African national rugby team captain
 Marthinus van Schalkwyk, former Minister of Tourism in the Cabinet of South Africa
 Frederik van Zyl Slabbert, political analyst, businessman and politician
 Dr Goolam Mahomed Hassen Mayet, medical doctor,  social and religious activist - the first non-white medical professional to have been employed by the then Pietersburg Provincial Hospital, who later went on to practice medicine for over 50 years in the city.

Coats of arms

Municipal (1)
By 1931, the Pietersburg municipal council had assumed a pseudo-heraldic "coat of arms". The shield depicted a crossed pick and shovel, two crossed wheatsheaves, and the date 1904 surrounded by a rib and bearing the motto Labor omnia vincit. The crest was an ostrich.

Municipal (2)
A proper coat of arms was designed in the 1960s. It was registered with the Transvaal Provincial Administration in August 1967 and at the Bureau of Heraldry in September 1969.

The arms were : Azure, on a fess Argent, between in chief a lion passant Argent, armed and langued Gules, and in base two chevrons humette, and a horseshoe Argent, placed 2 and 1, two cogwheels Gules. In layman's terms, this was a blue shield displaying, from top to bottom, a silver lion with red tongue and claws, a silver stripe bearing two red cogwheels, and two silver chevrons and a horseshoe.

The crest was a golden eagle, and the motto, once again, was Labor omnia vincit.

Municipal (3)
The Pietersburg municipal council registered a new coat of arms at the Bureau in October 2003.

The arms are : Vert, on a fess Argent, a woven grain basket, between two hoes with blades turned inward proper, their handles towards centre-base counterchanged Or and issuant from a voided cogwheel the inner ring cotised Argent, therein a sun Or; on a chief of the last a short-clawed Lark (Mirafra chuana) perched upon a leaf of the silky thorn tree (Acacia rehmanniana) proper, between two demi-peaks with points embattled Brunatre, issuant from the respective shield flanks. In layman's terms, the shield depicts, from top to bottom, (1) a short-clawed lark perched on an acacia leaf between two stylised peaks, (2) a woven grain basket between two hoes on a silver background, and (3) a silver cogwheel on a green background.

Above the shield is a brown rustic crown. The motto is Unity - Equity - Progress - prosperity.

References

External links
 
 Capricorn District Municipality website 
 

 
Polokwane
1886 establishments in the South African Republic
Populated places established in 1886
Populated places in the Polokwane Local Municipality
Provincial capitals in South Africa
Populated places founded by Afrikaners
Second Boer War concentration camps
Cities in South Africa